Hinduja Foundries Ltd (HFL) is a part of the $12 billion Hinduja Group. Hinduja Foundries is India’s largest casting maker. Hinduja has three facilities in Chennai and Hyderabad which put together manufacturer’s 100,000 MT of castings in the form of cylinder blocks, heads, housings, manifolds, brake drums etc., made of aluminum, cast iron and SG iron.

Hinduja Foundries has two plants. The parent company is in Ennore, Chennai, one in Sriperumbudur.

History
Hinduja Foundries was established in 1959 as Ennore Foundries. It was named so because it was founded in Ennore, a fishermens hamlet situated app.15 km north of Chennai. Initially promoted by British Leyland, Ennore Foundry began commercial production in 1961. Since then the castings manufactured at its plant has been supplied to automobile industries across India.

Hinduja Foundries was established to cater to the needs of Ashok Leyland and became the largest casting maker in India. Ennore foundries acquired Ductron Castings in Hyderabad and set up a green field foundry in Sriperumbudur.

Hinduja is the largest automotive jobbing foundry in India with production capacity of nearly 100,000 MT of grey iron casting and 3000 MT of aluminum gravity die-casting.

Products
Products from Hinduja Foundries range from 10 kg to 300 kg in grey iron and 0.5 to 16.5 kg in aluminum gravity die castings. Product ranges include cylinder blocks, cylinder heads, flywheels, flywheel housings, transmission casings, clutch plates, brake drums, intake manifolds and clutch housings for HCV, LCV and car segments.

Holdings
LRLIH Limited, UK (earlier a part of a British Leyland Group, UK) was acquired by Hindujas and Iveco Limited in 1987. Iveco a part of FIAT Group in Italy.

Hinduja Group was founded by Shri Paramnand Deepchand Hinduja in 1914 at Mumbai. Today Hinduja Group is a conglomerate with a presence in 25 countries and employs over 25,000 personnel worldwide. HG includes Transport, Energy, Information Technology, Agri Business, Project Development, Banking and Finance and Trading.

The company's promoters and their share holding details are LRLIH Limited, UK - 59.09%, Ashok Leyland - 21.01% and Public and Financial Institution - 19.90%.

References

External links
Hinduja Foundries website
Hinduja Group website
Ashok Leyland website
Hinduja Foundries plans investments worth 3.5 bln rupees. Reuters India. Tue 6 May 2008 6:25pm IST
Hinduja Foundries Is Back In Dividend List. Hinduja Foundries Limited, formerly known as Ennore Foundries Limited, will pay equity dividend after a gap of 10 years. News Post India. Tuesday 6 May 2008
Hinduja Foundries New Facility at Sriperumbudur Commences Production

Indian companies established in 1959
Manufacturing companies based in Chennai
Foundries
Hinduja Group
Metal companies of India
1959 establishments in Madras State